Setobaudinia is a genus of air-breathing land snails, terrestrial pulmonate gastropod mollusks in the family Camaenidae.

Species
Species within the genus Setobaudinia include:
 Setobaudinia collingii
 Setobaudinia victoriana
 Setobaudinia umbadayi

References

 GBIF info on the genus

 
Camaenidae
Taxonomy articles created by Polbot